Christian Jourdan (born 31 December 1954) is a former French racing cyclist. He competed in the individual road race event at the 1976 Summer Olympics, and rode in eleven Grand Tours between 1979 and 1989.

References

External links
 

1954 births
Living people
Cyclists at the 1976 Summer Olympics
French male cyclists
Olympic cyclists of France
Sportspeople from Gironde
Cyclists from Nouvelle-Aquitaine
21st-century French people
20th-century French people